Miroslav Gradinarov  (born ) is a Bulgarian male volleyballer who plays for VM Zalău in Romania and the Bulgaria national team. He represented his country at 2014 FIVB Volleyball Men's World Championship in Poland.

References

1985 births
Living people
Sportspeople from Varna, Bulgaria
Bulgarian men's volleyball players
S.L. Benfica volleyball players
Expatriate volleyball players in Tunisia
Expatriate volleyball players in Romania
Bulgarian expatriate sportspeople in Romania
Bulgarian expatriates in Portugal